The 1918 All-Ireland Senior Football Championship Final was the 31st All-Ireland Final and the deciding match of the 1918 All-Ireland Senior Football Championship, an inter-county Gaelic football tournament for the top teams in Ireland.

Tipperary's preparations were severely hampered by military regulations following the Soloheadbeg ambush, not to mention the death of Davey Tobin by Spanish flu. A disallowed goal and a last-minute miss by Gus McCarthy were enough to allow Wexford to complete a four-in-a-row. The match, played on 16 February 1919, had been postponed from the previous autumn due to the spread of the flu.

It was the fourth of four All-Ireland football titles won by Wexford in the 1910s. They have not since appeared in an All-Ireland football final.

References

Gaelic football
All-Ireland Senior Football Championship Finals
Tipperary county football team matches
Wexford county football team matches